George V was proclaimed King of the United Kingdom and the British Dominions, and Emperor of India, after his father, King Edward VII, died in the late hours of 6 May 1910. He was proclaimed king the following week, the first proclamation taking place on 7 May 1910 at St James's Palace.

United Kingdom 

The Lords of the Privy Council met at 4 p.m. on 7 May 1910 at St James's Palace, and gave orders for proclaiming King George V. After the preparations for the proclamation of accession, it had been issued for publication in a supplement to that day's London Gazette:

Commonwealth of Australia 
The proclamation in Australia took place at Government House in Melbourne on 9 May.

References 

George V
1910 in the United Kingdom
1910 in Australia
Proclamations
British monarchy